Wuhan Airlines Flight 343 was a domestic scheduled passenger flight between Enshi Airport and Wuhan Wangjiadun Airport, both in Hubei province, Central China. On June 22, 2000, the Wuhan Airlines Xian Y-7, registration B-3479, flying the route crashed after encountering an area of adverse weather; the aircraft was struck by lightning and encountered windshear.

Immediately after the accident, China ordered all of Wuhan Airlines' Xian Y-7 aircraft be grounded. One month after the accident, they were allowed to resume service.

The accident remains the deadliest involving a Xian Y-7 aircraft, and is today the 12th deadliest aviation accident in the history of China.

History
The Wuhan Airlines Xian Y-7 aircraft departed Enshi Airport, on June 22, 2000, for a flight to Wuhan Wangjiadun Airport. As the aircraft approached Wuhan, the flight crew were informed of adverse weather conditions in the area of the airport. The flight crew circled the airport for approximately 30 minutes, waiting for the weather to improve; during this time they debated whether to divert to another airport, but the pilot decided to continue to try and land at Wuhan.

Weather stations recorded 451 thunderclaps in ten minutes during the 30 minute period the aircraft was circling above the airport. At approximately 15:00 local time, the aircraft was impacted by windshear and struck by lightning, before it crashed in Sitai Village, Yongfeng Township. All 40 passengers and four crew were killed, along with seven people on the ground.

Grounding of Xian Y-7 aircraft
In the aftermath of the accident, the Civil Aviation Administration of China (CAAC) ordered all Wuhan Airlines' six other Xian Y-7 aircraft be grounded until the cause of the crash was determined. In July they were permitted to return to service after safety inspections were carried out and flight crews received more training. The CAAC ordered all Xian Y-7 aircraft be removed from scheduled passenger service by June 1, 2001.

Cause
The cause was determined to be the adverse weather the aircraft encountered, specifically the lightning strike. Other causes were the flight crew and air traffic control both violating standard operating procedures for severe weather, and incorrect decision making by the captain.

See also

LANSA Flight 508
Air France Flight 447
2002 Bristow Helicopters Sikorsky S-76A crash
List of accidents and incidents involving commercial aircraft
2000 in aviation

References

Aviation accidents and incidents in 2000
Aviation accidents and incidents in China
2000 disasters in China
History of Wuhan
Airliner accidents and incidents caused by lightning strikes
2000 meteorology
June 2000 events in China
Airliner accidents and incidents caused by pilot error
Aviation accidents and incidents caused by air traffic controller error
Airliner accidents and incidents caused by microbursts